AfroBasket 2009 was the 25th FIBA Africa Championship, played under the auspices of the Fédération Internationale de Basketball, the basketball sport governing body, and the African zone thereof. At stake were the three berths allocated to Africa in the 2010 FIBA World Championship.  The tournament was hosted by Libya after Nigeria, the original host, withdrew from hosting after not conforming to FIBA Africa guidelines.

Angola won its sixth consecutive African championship and tenth overall by beating Côte d'Ivoire 82-72 in the championship game.  Tunisia won the bronze medal game over Cameroon to earn its first-ever FIBA World Championship berth.  Angola, Côte d'Ivoire, and Tunisia move on to represent Africa at the 2010 FIBA World Championship in Turkey.  Angola's Joaquim Gomes claimed the tournament's Most Valuable Player award for the second consecutive Afrobasket tournament.

Tournament Overview
Widely considered among the most coveted sporting competitions in Africa, AfroBasket 2009 was hosted by Libya from  August 5 to August 15, 2009. Games were played in Tripoli and Benghazi, with four groups being equally divided between the country’s two largest cities.

It is estimated that over 70 media channels covered the engagements, with the top three positioned squads automatically qualifying to represent the continent for the 2010 World Championship, to be held from August 28 to September 12, in Turkey. This historic event also coincides with ongoing celebratory activities marking the 40th anniversary of Libya's 1 September Revolution (Great Al-Fatih Revolution) which brought Muammar Gaddafi to power, and the  tenth anniversary of the Sirte Declaration establishing the African Union (AU) on September 9, 1999.

Host Selection Process
Libya's selection as the host country was decided by the Fédération Internationale de Basketball (FIBA) Executive Committee, approved by the Central Board of FIBA Africa, and officially announced in Tripoli on February 7, 2009. The decision favoring Libya to organize the 25th edition, followed the withdrawal of Nigeria who failed to conform to FIBA Africa guidelines. Signing of the official contract was conducted at a ceremony at Tripoli’s Corinthia Bab Africa Hotel on February 4, 2009, in the presence of Libya’s National Olympic Committee president Mohammad Al-Amariy, Dr. Muhammad Gaddafi, and president of the Libyan Arab Basketball Federation (LBF), Omar El Barshushi.

Before reaching the contract signing stage, and after Nigeria’s withdrawal, an organizing committee was formed by FIBA to investigate the facilities Libya had to offer regarding basketball courts and the possibility of refurbishing sites. At the 4th Session of FIBA-Africa Central Committee meeting in Cairo, Egypt on January 25, 2009, the Libyan organizing committee presented plans and the preparation undertaken in order to successfully host the championships. The Central Board members who also made their recommendations approved the LBF presentation, which has been an FIBA Africa affiliate since 1961, and were described as excellent. The president of the Local Organizing Committee (LOC) invited FIBA Africa’s officials in Tripoli to view first hand Libya’s preparations. To this end, before signing the contract between FIBA Africa and LBF, the Secretary General of FIBA Africa, Dr. Alphonse Bilé, the Assistant Secretary General, Adel Tooma and the President of the Commission for Competitions, Raouf Menjour, checked thoroughly the facilities and basketball courts that will serve the event and gave their approval.

Venues
Two Libyan cities, Benghazi and Tripoli hosted games in the tournament.  Benghazi hosted games in Groups A, B, and E.  Tripoli hosted games in Groups C, D, and F, in addition to the knockout round games.

Games in Tripoli were held in the African Union Arena, a modern, 7,000 seat arena built in the capital city in 2006.  Games in Benghazi were held in the Suliman Ad-Dharrath Arena, part of the Medina al-Riyadhia (Sports City), the city's largest sporting centre. The 10,000 seat arena was built in 1967 and is therefore quite outdated. However, the stadia has undergone maintenance work in recent years.

Qualification

Participants were sixteen national basketball teams among the 53 FIBA Africa members. These teams included the host nation, the top three sides at the FIBA Africa Championship 2007 in Angola,  one wild card, and the top eleven sides at the 2009 Zone preliminary basketball competitions.  None of the countries in Qualification Zone 7 registered for the qualifying tournament, so a second wild card was added.  14 of the 16 teams that competed for the 2007 Championship returned, with host Libya and Congo replacing Liberia and DR Congo. The following national teams competed:

Format
A revised format will debut in the 2009 championship:
The teams will be divided into four groups (Groups A-D) for the preliminary round.
Round robin for the preliminary round; the top three teams from each group advance to the next round.
The top three teams from Groups A and B qualify to Eighth Final round Group E; the top three teams from Groups C and D qualify to Eighth Final Group F. The final scores of all games played in the preliminary round are valid for the eighth final round, including games against teams that did not advance beyond the preliminary round.
The top four teams from each of the Eighth final groups advance to the sudden-death quarterfinals. The quarterfinal match-ups will be:
QF1: 1E vs. 4F
QF2: 2F vs. 3E
QF3: 2E vs. 3F
QF4: 1F vs. 4E
The winners in the quarterfinals advance to the semifinals. The match-ups are:
SF1: QFW1 vs. QFW2
SF2: QFW3 vs. QFW4
Winners secure an automatic berth to the 2010 World Championship.
The semifinal teams will play in the sudden-death finals. The match-ups for the finals are:
Bronze medal game: SFL1 vs. SFL2
Winner secures an automatic berth to the 2010 World Championship.
Gold medal game: SFW1 vs. SFW2
Top 3 teams will automatically qualify to the 2010 FIBA World Championship which is held in Turkey.

Squads

Each of the sixteen teams competing was eligible to field a squad of twelve players for the tournament.  Only Cape Verde and host Libya did not take advantage of this limit, as both teams sent an 11-man squad to the competition.

Results

Preliminary round

The draw was held on June 26, 2009, in Libya.

All times are in local time UTC+2

Group A
Group A went according to form, as African powerhouse Nigeria was rarely challenged in the group en route to going undefeated.  Côte d'Ivoire grabbed the second eighth final spot out of Group A by winning its last two group games after losing its tournament opener to the Nigerians.  Host Libya, making its first tournament appearance since 1978, won its tournament opener over South Africa.  This was enough to qualify for the eighth final round as last place South Africa lost its last two games by a combined 85 points.

Group B
Five-time defending champion Angola surprisingly struggled in its first two games, slipping by Mali by 5 after ending the game on an 8–3 run, and beating Egypt after trailing at the half.  Angola again found themselves tied at the half against Mozambique before finally hitting their stride in outscoring their opponents 60–17 in the second half.  Mali took control in the second half against Egypt to finish second in the group; both teams advanced by virtue of their victories over last place Mozambique.

Group C
2005 silver medalists Senegal and 2007 silver medalists Cameroon both cruised to victories in their first two games to qualify for the eighth final round.  Senegal won a hard-fought two-point victory over Cameroon in the final group game to grab first place in the group.  Central African Republic thrashed over-matched Congo 113–61, in what amounted to an elimination game between two 0–2 teams on the last match day, to grab the final eighth final spot out of Group C.

Group D
Group D was the most tightly contested preliminary round group.  These games resulted in the most surprising result of this stage of the tournament as defending bronze medalists Cape Verde were eliminated even after their opening victory over Tunisia in spite of the efforts of Jeff Xavier, who would finish as the tournament's leading scorer.  Group D also saw one of the best games of the tournament, as Morocco's Mohamad Hachad single-handedly shocked Rwanda when he hit a three-pointer with 29 seconds left, then stole the ball and passed to Yunss Akinocho for a jumper to erase a four-point lead in an 85–84 victory.  Tunisia and Morocco both advanced with victories on the final day of group play after no team had clinched a spot in the eighth final coming into the final games.  Rwanda also advanced by virtue of its ten-point victory over Cape Verde.

Eighth Final round

Group E
Group E went according to form as defending champion Angola continued its undefeated run in the tournament by dismantling Libya and Côte d'Ivoire in its first two games.  Nigeria followed suit, albeit in less than dominating fashion, by slipping by Egypt and Mali to set up a showdown in the final group play match with Angola.  Nigeria hung with the defending champions in a hard-fought game that was close the whole way, but the Nigerians could not close the deficit below two in the fourth quarter en route to a 93–85 loss.

Mali coasted to two easy victories over Côte d'Ivoire and Libya to finish third in the group.  Côte d'Ivoire pulled away from Egypt in the fourth quarter to grab the final quarterfinal spot of the group.  Egypt lost all three games, including a humiliating 75–73 loss to Libya on Raed Elhamali's buzzer beater.  This was the first time in 19 appearances at the FIBA Africa Championship that the Egyptians failed to qualify for the semifinals.

Group F
Unlike Group E, Group F was filled with back-and-forth matches between all six teams.  Day 1 of the group saw plenty of action.  Rwanda, making only its second tournament appearance, stunned 24-time participant Senegal, which had been undefeated in group play.  Tunisia followed that up with a one-point victory over Central African Republic on Amine Rzig's jumper with four seconds left.

On Day 2, Central African Republic returned to form with a dominating 21-point victory over Rwanda.  Senegal was upset yet again when Mouhammad Faye missed two free throws with three seconds left in a 75–73 loss to Morocco.  Tunisia again won in dramatic fashion with a 68–66 victory over Cameroon when Parfait Bitee missed a 3-pointer at the buzzer.

Heading into Day 3, only Tunisia had clinched a quarterfinal spot.  Senegal rebounded from two consecutive losses to beat Tunisia and steal first place in the group from the Tunisians.  Despite losing to Rwanda, Cameroon finished third in the group. Central African Republic beat Morocco to claim the final quarterfinal spot.

Knockout round
The knockout stage was a single-elimination tournament involving the eight teams that qualified by finishing in the top four of their group in the eighth final stage of the tournament. There were three rounds of matches, with each round eliminating half of the teams entering that round. The successive rounds were: quarter-finals, semi-finals, final. There was also a play-off to decide third/fourth place. Each finalist and the winner of the third place game would qualify for the 2010 FIBA World Championship.

Quarterfinals
In the first game of the quarterfinals, Angola closed the third quarter on a 23–6 run en route to an 84–63 victory after Central African Republic had tied the game at 43 early in the second half.  The Angolans qualified for the semifinals for the 14th consecutive Afrobasket tournament.  Tunisia won a thriller over Mali 74-73 when Mali star Amara Sy missed the second of two free throws with one second on the clock.  In the third quarterfinal, Cameroon never trailed in the second half to stun Nigeria, whose only previous loss had come at the hands of Angola.  Group E fourth-place finisher Côte d'Ivoire followed the previous game with a shocker of their own in beating Group F first place Senegal.  The Ivorians dominated the beginning and end of the game after the team jumped out to a 16–2 first half lead and closed the game on a 16–6 run en route to a six-point victory.

Semifinals
In the semifinals, Tunisia hung with the powerhouse Angolans for much of the game.  The Tunisians never trailed by more than eleven in the fourth quarter but could not cut the deficit lower than five en route to a ten-point loss.  In a match-up between the two teams that pulled quarterfinal upsets, Côte d'Ivoire continued its Cinderella run with a victory over Cameroon.  The Ivorians closed the game on an 8–0 run in the final two minutes to turn a 61–60 deficit into a 68–61 victory to qualify for the team's first FIBA Africa Championship final since 1985.

Third-place playoff
In a game that would decide the third and final African qualifier for the 2010 FIBA World Championship, Tunisia never trailed in winning the bronze medal game over Cameroon in dominating fashion.  Tunisian star and All-Tournament First Team selection Amine Rzig scored a game-high 20 points.

Final
Angola won its sixth consecutive African championship after withstanding a valiant challenge from the upstart Côte d'Ivoire team.  Côte d'Ivoire took a surprising one-point lead into the half and kept the game close through the second half as the eventual 10-point margin of victory matched Angola's biggest lead in the game.

Classification round

5th-8th places
In the consolation bracket for quarterfinal losers, Central African Republic continued its strong run in the tournament following an 0–2 start in beating Mali 80-74.  In a match-up that most expected would take place in the semifinals, Nigeria regained its preliminary round form in dismantling Senegal in the second game.

Nigeria grabbed fifth place over the Central Africans in an uneventful game. Senegal defeated Mali in the seventh place game to end a disappointing tournament with a 5–4 record after starting the tournament 3–0.

9th-12th places
In the consolation bracket for eighth final losers, surprising Rwanda continued its strong run in its second ever Afrobasket tournament by finishing ninth and improving on last year's twelve place finish.  Egypt finished tenth with a 2–6 record, by far its worst performance in a FIBA Africa Championship.  The host Libyans finished in a strong eleventh place for a team making its first appearance in an Afrobasket tournament since 1978 on the strength of Hesham Ali Salem's 25-point, 14-rebound performance in the eleventh place game.

13th–16th places
In the consolation bracket for opening round losers, Cape Verde finally showed the form that won them the bronze medal at the FIBA Africa Championship 2007 in destroying Congo and Mozambique by 37 and 33 points, respectively.  Against Congo, Cape Verde star Jeff Xavier scored a tournament-high 38 points.  Mozambique slipped by South Africa 69–67 to grab its only win of the tournament en route to a 14th-place finish.  In the 15th-place game, South Africa claimed its only victory of the tournament and sent the over-matched Congo team home winless.

Final standings

Awards

Statistical leaders

Individual Tournament Highs

Points

Rebounds

Assists

Steals

Blocks

Minutes

Individual Game highs

Team Tournament Highs

Offensive PPG

Defensive PPG

Rebounds

Assists

Steals

Blocks

Team Game highs

All-Tournament Teams
The following players were voted to the All-Tournament teams by journalists and experts in attendance at the tournament:

First team
 Pape-Philippe Amagou
 DeSagana Diop
 Joaquim Gomes (Tournament MVP)
 Amine Rzig
 Romain Sato

Second Team
 Eduardo Mingas
 Carlos Morais
 Boniface Ndong
 Hesham Ali Salem
 Jeff Xavier

Third Team
 Babacar Cisse
 Armando Costa
 Michael Efevberha
 Gaston Essengue
 Mouhammad Faye
 Robert Thomson

Notes

External links
Official website
Afrobasket Forum
Interbasket Afrobasket coverage

See also
 2009 FIBA Africa Clubs Champions Cup

 
2009
2009 in African basketball
2009 in Libyan sport
International basketball competitions hosted by Libya
August 2009 sports events in Africa